The 1990 Junior Pan American Rhythmic Gymnastics Championships was held in Tallahassee, United States, July 16–23, 1990.

Medal summary

Junior division

Children's division

References

1990 in gymnastics
Pan American Gymnastics Championships
International gymnastics competitions hosted by the United States
1990 in American sports